Behind Enemy Lines may refer to:

Film
 Behind Enemy Lines (1986 film), an American film directed by Gideon Amir
 Behind Enemy Lines (1997 film), an American action film directed by Mark Griffiths
 Behind Enemy Lines (film series)
 Behind Enemy Lines (2001 film), an American film starring Gene Hackman and Owen Wilson, and three direct-to-video sequels:
Behind Enemy Lines II: Axis of Evil
Behind Enemy Lines: Colombia
SEAL Team 8: Behind Enemy Lines

Games
 Behind Enemy Lines (role-playing game), a 1982 military game
 Commandos: Behind Enemy Lines, a video game
 Behind Enemy Lines 2, the Russian name for the Men of War series.

Other uses
 Behind Enemy Lines (album), by Saving Grace
 Behind Enemy Lines (band), an American crust punk band
 Behind Enemy Lines (book), co-written by Holocaust survivor Marthe Cohn
 Behind Enemy Lines (Star Trek), a novel by John Vornholt
 "Behind Enemy Lines", a song by dead prez from their album Let's Get Free
 Airborne forces, which air drop behind enemy lines

See also
 Behind the Lines (disambiguation)